Everton Santos Bezerra (born 15 June 1984) is a former Brazilian professional footballer.

On 24 July 2014, he signed for Cypriot club Ethnikos Achna.

References

1984 births
Living people
Association football defenders
Footballers from Rio de Janeiro (city)
Brazilian footballers
Brasiliense Futebol Clube players
Grêmio Barueri Futebol players
Associação Desportiva Cabofriense players
Esporte Clube Juventude players
Veria F.C. players
Resende Futebol Clube players
Ethnikos Achna FC players
Campeonato Brasileiro Série A players
Campeonato Brasileiro Série B players
Cypriot First Division players
Super League Greece players
Brazilian expatriate footballers
Expatriate footballers in Greece
Expatriate footballers in Cyprus